What's Up Doc? was a children's program which aired on the Nine Network in Australia from 31 July 1993 until 24 December 1999. It centred on the showing of Warner Bros. cartoons and hosted segments with additional original elements. It followed on from The Bugs Bunny Show, a similar program hosted by Sophie Lee, which aired from 1990 until 1992.

History

It originally aired on Saturday mornings from 9:00am until 11:00am, before moving to weekdays at 4:30pm for half an hour beginning in February 1996. The show was filmed in studio on the same styled set for the whole run of the show, starting at Nine's Richmond, Victoria studios, before moving to studios in Willoughby, New South Wales. The hosts also regularly visited Warner Bros Movie World on the Gold Coast, Queensland where a weeks worth of episodes were filmed at a time.

The final episode aired on Friday December 24, 1999. The show was originally announced to return in early 2000, however a new Warner Bros cartoon themed program titled The Cool Room debuted in its place.

Hosts

Permanent
Danielle Fairclough (July 1993—July 1994)
Catriona Rowntree (August 1994—December 1995)
Steven Jacobs (February 1996—August 1996)
Kate Fischer (August 1996—October 1997)
Karen Fischer (November 1997—December 1999)

Temporary
Jo Beth Taylor (1996, 1997)
Julia Morris (1997)

Programming

When the show aired on weekday afternoons the cartoon series that were shown were Pinky and the Brain or Freakazoid! on Monday's, Looney Tunes and Merrie Melodies on Tuesday's and Thursday's, Animaniacs or The Sylvester and Tweety Mysteries or Waynehead on Wednesday's and Batman: The Animated Series or The New Batman Adventures or Batman Beyond or Pinky, Elmyra and the Brain on Friday's.

When the show aired on Saturday mornings there were additional series shown including The Porky Pig Show, The Road Runner Show, Tiny Toon Adventures, Taz-Mania, Superman: The Animated Series, Free Willy and Beetlejuice.

References

Nine Network original programming
Australian children's television series
Television programming blocks in Australia
1993 Australian television series debuts
1999 Australian television series endings
Television shows set in Australia
English-language television shows